Weenen-Kliprivier Commando was a light infantry regiment of the South African Army. It formed part of the South African Army Infantry Formation as well as the South African Territorial Reserve.

History

Origin

Rifle Association
Weenen-Kliprivier Commando can be traced back to the 1887 Estcourt and Ladysmith Rifle Associations and the later raised Ladysmith Town Guard of 1899.

Operations

With the UDF

World War One
Members of the Defence Rifle Associations volunteered and were deployed on active service during the First World War.

The final name of this commando was issued on 16 December 1948 by a Government Gazette notice designating the magisterial districts of Kliprivier (Ladysmith), Bergville, Estcourt, and Mooirivier under its mandate.

When Midmar Commando was formed, the Mooirivier district was then subsequently allocated to that commando. The area of responsibility encompassed the Lesotho border with Natal along the Orange Free State provincial border and southwards to the east of Ladysmith and finally southwards again to meet up with the Midmar Commando border.

The headquarters of this unit was close to the military base at Ladysmith, home to 5 SAI and situated on the site of an Anglo Boer war military camp used during the siege of Ladysmith.

With the SADF
By 1967, the Commando chose the eland as its regimental emblem but it was quickly changed to a Long Tom gun in the same year. Both were symbols of the area. In 1974 the Long Tom was changed again, this time for a wagon wheel above a broken spear. This resulted in a complaint by the then Minister Buthelezi, who argued that the symbol had connotations that were unacceptable to the Zulu people. This resulted in a redesign again by 1989.

The last emblem still had a wagon wheel but now encompassed a mountain as well as tears from a translation of the word weenen.

Colours
In 1991 the Commando received its National Colours at a parade in Pietermaritzburg, the home of Group 9.

Freedom of entry
On 31 October 1991, the Commando was also granted Freedom of Entry into Ladysmith.

With the SANDF

Disbandment
This unit, along with all other Commando units was disbanded after a decision by South African President Thabo Mbeki to disband all Commando Units. The Commando system was phased out between 2003 and 2008 "because of the role it played in the apartheid era", according to the Minister of Safety and Security Charles Nqakula.

Unit Insignia

Leadership 

 Cmdt A.W. Pretorius 1948-1965
 Capt J.H. Hattingh 1966-1967
 Cmdt J.J. van der Merwe 1967-1967
 Cmdt P.J. Meyer 1967-1969
 Cmdt H.S. van der Merwe 1969-1979
 Cmdt T.E. Southey 1979-1982
 Cmdt A.I. Odendaal 1982-1988
 Cmdt J.P. Verster 1988-1989
 Lt Col S.H. du Plessis 1989-1995
 Lt Col J.P. Verster 1995-2002
 Lt Col M.A. Pitout 2003 - 2007

References

See also 
 South African Commando System

Infantry regiments of South Africa
South African Commando Units